Yakubu Gowon Airport , also known as Jos Airport, is an airport serving Jos, the capital of the Plateau State of Nigeria.  It was named after Yakubu Gowon, the Nigerian head of state from 1966 to 1975.

Airlines and destinations

See also
Federal Airports Authority of Nigeria
Transport in Nigeria
List of airports in Nigeria

References

External links

SkyVector - Jos Airport
OurAirports - Jos
FAAN - Jos Facilities

Airports in Nigeria
Plateau State